Westwood/Rancho Park station is an at-grade light rail station in the Los Angeles County Metro Rail system located at the intersection of Westwood Boulevard and Exposition Boulevard in the Rancho Park neighborhood of West Los Angeles, California. It serves the E Line.

Although opponents filed a lawsuit to halt construction, they were ultimately unsuccessful in their efforts (see Opposition section, below).

Service

Station layout 

Westwood/Rancho Park Station is located at Exposition Boulevard just east of Westwood Boulevard, between Westwood Boulevard and Overland Avenue. This station is located in Rancho Park, an affluent single-family neighborhood south of Westwood and southwest of Century City.  The station location is a short walk from the Westside Pavilion shopping mall.

The final environmental impact report included 170 surface parking spaces at this station, with an option to remove all parking for transit users (20 parking spaces would be provided for local residents only).  In March 2011, the Expo Board approved the no-parking option.  Sepulveda station, less than one mile away, has a parking lot.

Hours and frequency

Connections 
, the following connections are available:
 Big Blue Bus (Santa Monica): 8, Rapid 12
 Culver CityBus: 3

Opposition 
In the Final EIR, Metro staff recommended routing the Expo Line along the Exposition Right-Of-Way through Rancho Park (which includes Westwood Station), at-grade.  During the EIR process, a group of neighbors known as Neighbors For Smart Rail (NFSR) organized to oppose at-grade light rail through this ROW.  The group claims that this design will be dangerous if built as specified, and that Metro failed to comply with environmental law.  Metro publicly disputed these claims, as did several groups supporting the current design.

On March 5, 2010, NFSR filed a lawsuit to halt construction of Expo Phase 2.  This lawsuit was dismissed by the Superior Court of the State of California on February 22, 2011.

Attractions
The Westwood Neighborhood Greenway, a linear park built on unused right-of-way and planted with native species, is located next to this station.

References 

 Curbed Staff (November 24, 2014) "Expo Line Extension is 80 Percent Done; See the New Stations" Curbed Los Angeles

E Line (Los Angeles Metro) stations
Railway stations in Los Angeles
Rancho Park, Los Angeles
Railway stations in the United States opened in 2016
2016 establishments in California
Pacific Electric stations